The Seventh-day Adventist Church in the North Island of New Zealand is formally organised as the North New Zealand Conference (NNZ). It is one of 2 conferences of the New Zealand Pacific Union Conference, under the South Pacific Division.

Its regional office is located in Wiri, Auckland.

The head office of the Seventh-day Adventist Church in the South Pacific is in Wahroonga, New South Wales, Australia.

The vision/purpose/mission statement of the church in this region is:
"Building Leaders. Growing the Church. Serving the World."

See also
 Seventh-day Adventist Church

References

External links
 official website
Adventist Directory Locate Adventist Entities
Adventist Yearbook The Official Organizational Directory

History of the Seventh-day Adventist Church
Seventh-day Adventist Church in Oceania